Lohia is a surname. Notable people with the surname include:

Aloke Lohia (born 1958), Indian businessman
Mohan Lal Lohia, Indian businessman
Ram Manohar Lohia, activist for the Indian independence movement
Sri Prakash Lohia, Indian businessman

See also
Lohia Machinery